Pisciglobus is a Gram-positive, facultatively anaerobic, non-spore-forming and non-motile genus of bacteria from the family of Carnobacteriaceae with on known species (Pisciglobus halotolerans). Pisciglobus halotolerans has been isolated from fish sauce from Thailand.

References

Lactobacillales
Bacteria genera
Monotypic bacteria genera
Taxa described in 2011